Caprellinoides elegans is a species of amphipods (crustaceans commonly known as skeleton shrimps) in the family Caprellidae.

References 
Notes

Sources
 Biodiversity of the Weddell Sea: macrozoobenthic species (demersal fish included) sampled during the expedition ANT Xllll3 (EASIZ I) with RV "Polarstern". Julian Gutt, Boris I. Sirenko, Wolf E. Arntz, Igor S. Smirnov and Claude De Broyer, Ber. Polarforsch. 372 (2000) ISSN 0176-5027

External links 
 

Corophiidea
Crustaceans described in 1932